DBTSS, the DataBase of Transcriptional Start Sites, is a database hosted by the Human Genome Center at the University of Tokyo. It contains the exact positions of transcriptional start sites  in the genomes of various organisms.

See also
 Transcription

References

External links
 http://dbtss.hgc.jp.

Biological databases
Gene expression